Gelastocoris rotundatus is a species of toad bug in the family Gelastocoridae. It is found in Central America and North America.

References

Further reading

 

Articles created by Qbugbot
Insects described in 1901
Gelastocoridae